Chad Broughton is author of Boom, Bust, Exodus: The Rust Belt, the Maquilas, and a Tale of Two Cities and contributor to The Atlantic magazine. Broughton is an American sociologist at the University of Chicago in the Public Policy Studies program in the College. His areas of specialty include ethnography, urban sociology, poverty and inequality, transnationalism and immigration, and labor studies and the sociology of work. Broughton, born in 1971, received his Bachelor of Arts from Indiana University in 1993 and his PhD from the University of Chicago in 2001. He taught at Knox College in Galesburg, Illinois, from 2001 to 2006.

References

External links 
 Publisher page for Boom, Bust, Exodus: The Rust Belt, the Maquilas, and a Tale of Two Cities
 Chad Broughton's author page at The Atlantic

1971 births
Living people
American sociologists
People from Galesburg, Illinois
University of Chicago faculty
Indiana University alumni
University of Chicago alumni